The Penken is a mountain area in the Ziller Valley located in the Austrian Tyrol.

The Penken can be reached by modern cable car from the village of Mayrhofen.

References

Mountain ranges of Tyrol (state)
Tux Alps